Harald Duschek (born 5 May 1956) is an East German former ski jumper. He competed in the large hill event at the 1980 Winter Olympics.

In 1996 he began working as a leader for a medical rehabilitation program conducting therapy.

References

External links

1956 births
Living people
People from Thale
People from Bezirk Halle
German male ski jumpers
Olympic ski jumpers of East Germany
Ski jumpers at the 1980 Winter Olympics
Sportspeople from Saxony-Anhalt